Tom A. Wright is a Republican politician who has served as a member of the Florida Senate since 2018. Wright represents the 14th district, encompassing parts of Brevard and Volusia counties.

History
A native of Iowa, Wright moved to Florida in 2004.

Incumbent Dorothy Hukill died of cervical cancer on October 2, 2018, just over a month before the election. A six-member panel of Republican Party officials from Brevard and Volusia counties selected Wright as Hukill's replacement.

Florida Senate
Because ballots for the November 6, 2018 general election had already been printed by the time Wright was named as Hukill's replacement, his name did not appear on the ballot; instead, votes for Hukill were counted as votes for Wright.

Wright was elected with 56.33% of the vote, defeating Democrat Melissa "Mel" Martin.

References

Living people
Republican Party Florida state senators
21st-century American politicians
People from Algona, Iowa
1952 births